Python Package Manager (PyPM) is a Python utility intended to simplify the tasks of locating, installing, upgrading and removing Python packages. It can determine if the most recent version of a software package is installed on a system, and can install or upgrade that package from a local or remote host.

PyPM is non-free and may only be used with ActiveState's ActivePython distribution.

PyPM uses “PyPM Repositories”, collections of pre-compiled packages. These repositories contain a high variety of modules, published on PyPI.

PyPM is inspired by Perl package manager (PPM).

See also
 pip (package manager)
 EasyInstall, a source-based installation utility
 RubyGems, a package manager for the Ruby programming language
 Npm (software), a package manager for the Node.js
 Composer (software), a package manager for PHP.

References

External links
 PyPM Index

Python (programming language) development tools
Proprietary package management systems